The women's speed event at the 2018 Asian Games took place on 23 August 2018 at Jakabaring Sport City, Palembang, Indonesia.

Schedule
All times are Western Indonesia Time (UTC+07:00)

Results 
Legend
DNS — Did not start
FS — False start

Qualification

Knockout round

References

External links
Official website

Sport climbing at the 2018 Asian Games